A World Trade Center (also World Trade Centre or WTC) is a building or complex of buildings used for the promotion and expansion of trade and licensed to use the "World Trade Center" name by the World Trade Centers Association (WTCA). As of May 2020, the WTCA included 323 properties in 90 countries. Founded in 1968, serves as a non-political umbrella organization within which members network for the provision of trade services and to develop international trade relations. A World Trade Center brings services associated with global commerce together under one roof.

List

Gallery

See also
 List of tallest buildings and structures in the world
 List of twin buildings and structures
 World Trade Centers Association
 :Category:World Trade Centers

References

International trade organizations